The Prosserman Jewish Community Centre is a Jewish Community Centre for the Toronto area. It is located along Bathurst Street in the Bathurst Manor neighbourhood of Toronto.

History
The Bathurst Jewish Community Centre was founded in 1930 as the YMHA (Young Men's Hebrew Association). In 1953 a new facility was built, the Bloor Street "Y" at Bloor Street and Spadina Avenue. It is still there today, but has been completely renovated and is now called the Miles Nadal JCC. In 1958, a new JCC campus was started to the north on Bathurst Street to meet demand from changing demographics in that corridor. The BJCC eventually contained a range of facilities and programs, including multiple athletic spaces, the Leah Posluns Theatre, Centre Camp, Kolel: The Adult Centre for Liberal Jewish Learning, the Family Resource Centre, and the Koffler Centre of the Arts.

In the late 2000s, the BJCC plans were made to replace the entire complex with new buildings, which is now the Prosserman JCC.

Koffler Centre of the Arts

Opened in 1977 inside the BJCC, the "Koffler Centre of the Arts" is a broad-based cultural institution that was established by Murray and Marvelle Koffler. The Koffler Centre teaches dance, music, and visual arts; presents exhibitions of cutting-edge contemporary Canadian art; and is home to the Helen and Stan Vine Canadian Jewish Book Awards, the Annual Jewish Book Fair, the Koffler Chamber Orchestra, and the Stars of the 21st Century Gala.  It presents concerts, film screenings, poetry, spoken word, comedy, and discussions on world issues through the lens of culture.

Leah Posluns Theatre
The Leah Polsuns Theatre was founded in 1977 as a live performance venue at the then BJCC. The 444 seat theatre closed when the BJCC was being  re-developed in 2009 and reopened in 2020 at 300+ seats venue at the new Prosserman Jewish Community Centre. The theatre is named for Leah Polsuns (1901-1971), wife of Toronto businessman and philanthropist Louis Polsuns.

Centre Camp

Lipa Green Centre for Jewish Community Services
While not part of the JCC itself, the Lipa Green Centre for Jewish Community Services had a building on the same property as the BJCC. When the BJCC was redeveloped, plans called for the Lipa Green Centre, itself having just undergone a major renovation, to be connected by various bridges and atriums to the main JCC complex.

Sherman Campus/Prosserman JCC 
In 2007, the UJA of Greater Toronto announced plans to demolish the BJCC and build a newer, more advanced, and larger complex on the same site. The name given to the lot and the all of the proposed buildings therein was the "Sherman Campus".
In 2009 the BJCC was demolished and in its place started construction on the Prosserman Jewish Community Centre. The new JCC was named for businessman and philanthropist 
Martin Prosserman (1931-2019) whom gifted $12 million to the construction. The first phase (The Donald Gales Family Pavilion) was completed in 2010. The first phase of the Prosserman Centre is considerably smaller than the BJCC and offers very limited programming. It is the current home to the Koffler gallery for the arts, and has absorbed many of the employees and programs offered by the BJCC, however, many more people were laid off when the building was demolished. The Prosserman JCC currently houses a limited health centre.
UJA continues to fundraise to begin the second phase of construction.

References

External links
Prosserman Jewish Community Centre

Buildings and structures in Toronto
Community centres in Canada
Jewish organizations based in Canada
Jewish Community Center
Jews and Judaism in Ontario
1930 establishments in Ontario
Jewish organizations established in 1930